A fadeaway or fall-away in basketball is a jump shot taken while jumping backwards, away from the basket. The goal is to create space between the shooter and the defender, making the shot much harder to block. The shooter must have very good accuracy, much higher than when releasing a regular jump shot, and must use more strength to counteract the backwards momentum in a relatively short amount of time. Because the movement is away from the basket, the shooter also has less chance to grab their own rebound.

Because the shooting percentage is lower in fadeaway due to the difficulty of the shot and because it is harder for the shooter to get their own rebound, many coaches and players believe it is one of the worst shots in the game to take. Once mastered, it is one of the hardest methods of shooting for defenders to block. The threat of a fadeaway forces a defender to jump into the shooter, and with a pump fake, the shooter can easily get a foul on the defender.

Only a handful of great NBA players have been successful shooting fadeaways. Wilt Chamberlain was a famous pioneer of the fadeaway, and Kevin McHale helped popularise it in the 1980s. Michael Jordan and Kobe Bryant are regarded as the most popular shooters of the fadeaway. Dirk Nowitzki, DeMar DeRozan, and others are also well known for using this move.

See also
Basketball moves

References

External links 
 

Basketball terminology